Events in the year 1945 in Venezuela

Incumbents
President: Isaías Medina Angarita until October 18, Revolutionary Junta after October 18

Events
October 18: 1945 Venezuelan coup d'état

Deaths

 
1940s in Venezuela
Years of the 20th century in Venezuela
Venezuela
Venezuela